János Fejes (born 9 May 1993) is a Hungarian football player who currently plays for Füzesgyarmati SK.

Club statistics

Updated to games played as of 19 November 2014.

References

HLSZ

1993 births
Living people
People from Jászberény
Hungarian footballers
Association football defenders
Budapest Honvéd FC players
Gyirmót FC Győr players
Soroksár SC players
Ceglédi VSE footballers
Nemzeti Bajnokság I players
Nemzeti Bajnokság II players
Sportspeople from Jász-Nagykun-Szolnok County